Wolfgang Funkel (born 10 August 1958) is a German former footballer.

The defender played over 300 matches in the (West) German top-flight. In 1986 Funkel won two caps for the West Germany national team.

He is the brother of Friedhelm Funkel.

Honours
Bayer Uerdingen
DFB-Pokal: 1984–85

Kaiserslautern
DFL-Supercup: 1991

References

External links
 
 
 

1958 births
Living people
German footballers
Germany international footballers
Germany under-21 international footballers
Bundesliga players
2. Bundesliga players
Rot-Weiß Oberhausen players
KFC Uerdingen 05 players
1. FC Kaiserslautern players
Olympic footballers of West Germany
West German footballers
Footballers at the 1988 Summer Olympics
Olympic bronze medalists for West Germany
German football managers
1. FC Kaiserslautern managers
Olympic medalists in football
Medalists at the 1988 Summer Olympics
Association football defenders
Sportspeople from Neuss
Footballers from North Rhine-Westphalia
20th-century German people